William James "Bill" Healy (March 4, 1939 – October 21, 2001) was a member of the Ohio House of Representatives from 1975–2000.  His district consisted of a portion of Canton, Ohio.  He was succeeded by fellow Democrat Mary Cirelli.

References

2001 deaths
Democratic Party members of the Ohio House of Representatives
1939 births
20th-century American politicians